Pasiphila excisa is a moth in the family Geometridae. It was described by Arthur Gardiner Butler in 1878. It is found in Russia, Japan and Korea.

The larvae feed on the flowers of Rhododendron species and Eurya japonica.

References

Moths described in 1878
excisa
Moths of Japan
Taxa named by Arthur Gardiner Butler